Cryptandra nutans is a species of flowering plant in the family Rhamnaceae and is endemic to the southwest of Western Australia. Flowering occurs in August and September. It was first formally described in 1845 by Ernst Gottlieb von Steudel in Lehmann's Plantae Preissianae from specimens collected in 1840. The specific epithet (nutans) means "nodding".

This cryptandra grows in gravelly sand or clayey soils over laterite in the Avon Wheatbelt, Coolgardie, Esperance Plains, Geraldton Sandplains, Jarrah Forest, Mallee and Swan Coastal Plain  bioregions of south-western Western Australia.

References

nutans
Rosales of Australia
Flora of Western Australia
Plants described in 1845
Taxa named by Ernst Gottlieb von Steudel